The Forbes China Celebrity 100 is a list published annually by Forbes that ranks the influence of Chinese celebrities. First published in 2004, it is similar to Celebrity 100 also published by Forbes. Factors that are taken into account include income, search engine hits, as well as exposure in newspapers, magazines, and television. 

In 2010, the list started to include Chinese celebrities born in Hong Kong, Taiwan, and other countries or regions. Prior to 2010, it only included celebrities born in mainland China. In 2016, the list was discontinued due to Forbes ceasing its operations in China. In 2017, the list was revived.

References

External links

 2004 List
 2005 List
 2006 List
 2007 List
 2008 List
 2009 List
 2010 List
 2011 List
 2012 List
 2013 List
 2014 List
 2015 List
 2017 List

Lists of 21st-century people
Annual magazine issues
Lists of celebrities
Forbes lists
Lists of Chinese people